The Republican Party of National Reconstitution (PRRN), commonly known as the Reconstitution Party, was a political party in Portugal

History
The PRRN was established in 1920 as a right-wing breakaway from the Democratic Party. The new party emerged as the third-largest in the 1921 elections, winning 12 of the 163 seats in the House of Representatives and 7 of the 71 seats in the Senate. The 1922 elections saw the party win 17 House seats and 10 Senate seats.

In 1923 the PRRN merged with the Republican Liberal Party and the National Republican Party to form the Nationalist Republican Party.

References

Conservative parties in Portugal
Defunct political parties in Portugal
Political parties established in 1920
Political parties disestablished in 1923
1920 establishments in Portugal
1923 disestablishments in Portugal